Vincent Nguyen (born Nguyễn Mạnh Hiếu on May 8, 1966) is an auxiliary bishop of the Archdiocese of Toronto. On November 6, 2009 Nguyen was appointed by Pope Benedict XVI as one of two new Auxiliary Bishops for the Archdiocese of Toronto along with Bishop William McGrattan.

Nguyen was born in South Vietnam and moved to Canada in 1984 just nine years after the Fall of Saigon which ended the Vietnam War. He holds a Bachelor of Applied Science in electrical engineering from the University of Toronto and a Masters of Divinity from St. Augustine's Seminary in Toronto. He was ordained a priest on 9 May 1998.  He then did further studies in Rome, where he received a licentiate in canon law from the Angelicum. From September 2009 to his consecration as bishop, he served as Chancellor and Moderator of the Curia of the Archdiocese of Toronto.

Nguyen is Canada's first Bishop of Asian descent. He is currently the third youngest Bishop in Canada.

See also 

 Archdiocese of Toronto

References 

1966 births
21st-century Roman Catholic bishops in Canada
Living people
University of Toronto alumni
Vietnamese emigrants to Canada
21st-century Roman Catholic titular bishops
Applicants_for_refugee_status_in_Canada